Shadow Array is a sculpture by Patrick Marold, installed at the Denver International Airport in Denver, Colorado, U.S.

References

Outdoor sculptures in Denver
Denver International Airport